José Cabrera may refer to:

Public officials
José Antonio Cabrera (1768–1820), Argentine statesman 
Manuel José Estrada Cabrera (1857–1924), Guatemalan general and president from 1898 to 1920
José Ramón Balaguer Cabrera (born 1932), Cuban Communist Party and government official

Sports personalities
José Cabrera (baseball) (born 1972), Dominican Republic player in Major League Baseball
José Cabrera (basketball) (born 1921), Mexican Olympic basketball player
José Cabrera (footballer) (born 1982), Spanish footballer 
Miguel Cabrera (full name José Miguel Cabrera Torres, born 1983), Venezuelan player in Major League Baseball
José Cabrera (boxer) (born 1987), Mexican pugilist

Others
José Luis Calderón Cabrera (1922–2003), Mexican architect and academic 
Jose Benito Cabrera Cuevas (born 1963), Colombian guerrilla leader whose nom de guerre is Fabián Ramírez
Jose Luis Cabrera (artist) (born 1984), Guatemalan-American contemporary visual artist

See also
José Cabrera Nuclear Power Station, facility at Almonacid de Zorita, Spain
Cabrera (surname)